Yiu Ho Ming (born 1 May 1995) is a Hong Kong professional footballer who currently plays as a left back for Hong Kong Premier League club Rangers.

Club career
In 2008, Yiu joined Eastern.

On 24 March 2013, Yiu scored a goal for Eastern against Happy Valley, which the match wins 1–0.

In 2014, Yiu was loaned to Tai Po.

In 2015, Yiu was loaned to Dreams Metro Gallery.

On 24 April 2016, Yiu scored his first goal for Metro Gallery against Southern, which the match draws 1–1.

In 2016, Yiu was loaned to Yuen Long for 2 seasons.

In 2018, Yiu finally got the chances to play for Eastern, appearing in 9 league matches.

However, in 2019, Yiu was loaned out again and he joined Pegasus for the first half of the season. On 13 January 2020, he left the club after terminating his loan contract. 

On 15 January 2020, Yiu was loaned to Yuen Long again for the rest of the season.

In July 2020, Yiu was released by Eastern after his contract expired.

On 10 September 2020, Rangers' Director of Football Philip Lee declared that Yiu would join the club.

Honours
Yuen Long
Hong Kong Senior Shield: 2017–18

References

External links
 
 Yiu Ho Ming at HKFA
 

1995 births
Living people
Hong Kong footballers
Association football defenders
Association football midfielders
Eastern Sports Club footballers
Tai Po FC players
Yokohama FC players
Metro Gallery FC players
Yuen Long FC players
TSW Pegasus FC players
Hong Kong Rangers FC players
Hong Kong Premier League players
Footballers at the 2018 Asian Games
Asian Games competitors for Hong Kong